The Claro River is a river of São Paulo state in southeastern Brazil. It is an upper tributary of the Tietê River.

See also
List of rivers of São Paulo

References
IBGE

Rivers of São Paulo (state)